Global Payments Inc. is an American multinational financial technology company that provides payment technology and services to merchants, issuers and consumers. In June 2021, the company was named to the Fortune 500. The company processes payments made through credit cards, debit cards, and digital and contactless payments.

History
Global Payments was founded in 1996 and spun off from National Data Corporation, its former parent company, in 2001.  Global Payments has been an independent, publicly-traded company on the New York Stock Exchange having the ticker symbol “GPN” since its spin off.

In 2009, it paid $75 million for United Card Service, Russia's leading credit card processing company. In 2011, Global Payments's United Card Service bought Alfa-Bank's credit card processing unit. In October 2012, it acquired the smaller Accelerated Payment Technologies for $413 million. In October 2014, it purchased Australian payment processing company Ezidebit for $305 million. In January 2015, it bought Payment Processing (also known as PayPros), a California company, for $420 million.

In March 2015 Global Payments bought Realex Payments, an Irish-based payments gateway services company, for €115 million. On April 25, 2016, Global Payments completed the acquisition of Heartland Payment Systems for $4.3 billion. Both Global Payments and its subsidiary Heartland Payment Systems were among the leading credit card processing companies in 2016, according to Business Insider.  Its headquarters moved from Sandy Springs, Georgia to Atlanta, Georgia in 2016.

In 2017, Global Payments initiated acquiring divisions of Active Networks. In 2018, Global Payments completed the acquisition of AdvancedMD. In 2018, Global Payments completed the acquisition of Sentral Education.

On May 28, 2019, Global Payments announced a $21.5 billion merger with TSYS. The merger is expected to trigger a Federal Trade Commission investigation.

Its largest deal to date would have been the reported merger with FIS (company), estimated around US$70 billion, but which fell apart at the last minute in December 2020. However, it is expected to be revisited in 2022.

In August 2022, Global Payments entered a definitive agreement to acquire EVO Payments Inc. for nearly $4 billion.

Services and operations
Global Payments provides payment services directly to merchants and indirectly through other financial organizations. Its technology-enabled services also support integrated payments, e-commerce, and omni-channel services.

Through Total System Services (TSYS), its issuer processor business, Global Payments helps banks manage credit and debit card portfolios.

Global Payments operates in more than 100 countries and serves 3.5 million merchants as well as 1,300 financial institutions. The company processes more than 50 billion transactions per year. After merging with TSYS in 2019, Global Payments has nearly 24,000 employees.

In 2020, 63 percent of the company's revenue was derived from "Merchant Solutions"  26 percent from Issuer Solutions, and 11 percent from the Business and Consumer Solutions segment, which operates as NetSpend. Eighty percent of Global Payments Merchant Solutions revenue was from North America, 15 percent was from Europe, and five percent was from Asia.

Controversy
In 2012, a data breach at Global Payments affected 1.5 million credit and debit card numbers.  This breach eventually cost the company around $100 million.  In 2015, a technical fault with Global Payments's systems led to thousands of British businesses being unable to accept credit card payments on Valentine's Day weekend.

References

External links

Financial services companies established in 2000
Online payments
Corporate spin-offs
Companies listed on the New York Stock Exchange
American companies established in 2000
Companies based in Atlanta
Payment service providers
Financial technology companies
2001 initial public offerings